The 2016–17 UEFA Europa League was the 46th season of Europe's secondary club football tournament organised by UEFA, and the eighth season since it was renamed from the UEFA Cup to the UEFA Europa League.

The final was played between Ajax and Manchester United at the Friends Arena in Solna, Sweden. Manchester United beat Ajax 2–0 to win their first title. With this victory, they became the fifth club – after Juventus, Ajax, Bayern Munich and Chelsea – to have won all three major European trophies (European Champion Clubs' Cup/UEFA Champions League, UEFA Cup/UEFA Europa League, and the now-defunct Cup Winners' Cup).

Manchester United qualified for the 2017–18 UEFA Champions League, and also earned the right to play against the winners of the 2016–17 UEFA Champions League, Real Madrid, in the 2017 UEFA Super Cup.

As the title holders, Sevilla qualified for the 2016–17 UEFA Champions League. Having won the last three Europa League tournaments, Sevilla were unable to defend their titles as they reached the Champions League knockout stage, where they were eliminated by Leicester City in the round of 16.

Association team allocation
A total of 188 teams from 54 of the 55 UEFA member associations were expected to participate in the 2016–17 UEFA Europa League (the exception being Kosovo, whose participation was not accepted in their first attempt as UEFA members). The association ranking based on the UEFA country coefficients was used to determine the number of participating teams for each association:
Associations 1–51 (except Liechtenstein) each had three teams qualify.
 As the winners of the 2015–16 UEFA Europa League, Sevilla qualified for the 2016–17 UEFA Champions League; the 2016–17 UEFA Europa League berth they would otherwise have earned for finishing 7th in the 2015–16 La Liga was vacated and not passed to another Spanish team.
Associations 52–53 each had two teams qualify.
Liechtenstein and Gibraltar each had one team qualify (Liechtenstein organises only a domestic cup and no domestic league; Gibraltar as per decision by the UEFA Executive Committee).
Moreover, 33 teams eliminated from the 2016–17 UEFA Champions League were transferred to the Europa League.

The UEFA Executive Committee approved in December 2014 changes to the rewards given according to the Respect Fair Play ranking, and starting from the 2016–17 season, the three Fair Play berths were no longer allocated to the Europa League.

Association ranking
For the 2016–17 UEFA Champions League, the associations were allocated places according to their 2015 UEFA country coefficients, which took into account their performance in European competitions from 2010–11 to 2014–15.

Apart from the allocation based on the country coefficients, associations could have additional teams participating in the Europa League, as noted below:
 – Additional teams transferred from Champions League
 – Vacated berth due to Europa League title holders playing in Champions League

Notes

Distribution
In the default access list, Sevilla enter the third qualifying round (as the seventh-placed team of the 2015–16 La Liga). However, since they qualified for the Champions League as the Europa League title holders, the spot which they qualified for in the Europa League third qualifying round is vacated, and the following changes to the default allocation system are made:
The domestic cup winners of association 18 (Cyprus) are promoted from the second qualifying round to the third qualifying round.
The domestic cup winners of associations 27 (Serbia) and 28 (Slovenia) are promoted from the first qualifying round to the second qualifying round.

Redistribution rules
A Europa League place is vacated when a team qualifies for both the Champions League and the Europa League, or qualifies for the Europa League by more than one method. When a place is vacated, it is redistributed within the national association by the following rules (regulations Articles 3.03 and 3.04):
When the domestic cup winners (considered as the "highest-placed" qualifier within the national association with the latest starting round) also qualify for the Champions League, their Europa League place is vacated. As a result, the highest-placed team in the league which have not yet qualified for European competitions qualify for the Europa League, with the Europa League qualifiers which finish above them in the league moved up one "place".
When the domestic cup winners also qualify for the Europa League through league position, their place through the league position is vacated. As a result, the highest-placed team in the league which have not yet qualified for European competitions qualify for the Europa League, with the Europa League qualifiers which finish above them in the league moved up one "place" if possible.
For associations where a Europa League place is reserved for the League Cup winners, they always qualify for the Europa League as the "lowest-placed" qualifier. If the League Cup winners have already qualified for European competitions through other methods, this reserved Europa League place is taken by the highest-placed team in the league which have not yet qualified for European competitions.

Teams
The labels in the parentheses show how each team qualified for the place of its starting round:
CW: Cup winners
2nd, 3rd, 4th, 5th, 6th, etc.: League position
LC: League Cup winners
RW: Regular season winners
PW: End-of-season European competition play-offs winners
CL: Transferred from Champions League
GS: Third-placed teams from group stage
PO: Losers from play-off round
Q3: Losers from third qualifying round

Notably two teams took part in the competition that were not playing in their national top division, Zürich (2nd tier) and Hibernian (2nd tier).

Notes

Round and draw dates
The schedule of the competition was as follows (all draws were held at the UEFA headquarters in Nyon, Switzerland, unless stated otherwise).

Matches in the qualifying, play-off, and knockout rounds could also be played on Tuesdays or Wednesdays instead of the regular Thursdays due to scheduling conflicts.

Qualifying rounds

In the qualifying rounds and the play-off round, teams were divided into seeded and unseeded teams based on their 2016 UEFA club coefficients, and then drawn into two-legged home-and-away ties. Teams from the same association could not be drawn against each other.

First qualifying round
The draws for the first and second qualifying round were held on 20 June 2016. The first legs were played on 28 and 30 June, and the second legs were played on 5, 6 and 7 July 2016.

Second qualifying round
The first legs were played on 14 July, and the second legs were played on 20 and 21 July 2016.

Third qualifying round
The draw for the third qualifying round was held on 15 July 2016. The first legs were played on 28 July, and the second legs were played on 3 and 4 August 2016.

Play-off round

The draw for the play-off round was held on 5 August 2016. The first legs were played on 17 and 18 August, and the second legs were played on 25 August 2016.

Group stage

The draw for the group stage was held on 26 August 2016, at the Grimaldi Forum in Monaco. The 48 teams were drawn into twelve groups of four, with the restriction that teams from the same association could not be drawn against each other. For the draw, the teams were seeded into four pots based on their 2016 UEFA club coefficients.

In each group, teams play against each other home-and-away in a round-robin format. The group winners and runners-up advance to the round of 32, where they are joined by the eight third-placed teams of the 2016–17 UEFA Champions League group stage. The matchdays are 15 September, 29 September, 20 October, 3 November, 24 November, and 8 December 2016.

A total of 21 national associations are represented in the group stage. Astana, Celta Vigo, Dundalk, Hapoel Be'er Sheva, Konyaspor, Mainz 05, Manchester United, Nice, Olympiacos, Osmanlıspor, Sassuolo, Southampton and Zorya Luhansk made their debut appearances in the UEFA Europa League group stage (although Celta Vigo and Olympiacos had appeared in the UEFA Cup group stage and Manchester United and Olympiacos had already competed in the UEFA Europa League knockout phase after a third place in the UEFA Champions League group stage).

Group A

Group B

Group C

Group D

Group E

Group F

Group G

Group H

Group I

Group J

Group K

Group L

Knockout phase

In the knockout phase, teams play against each other over two legs on a home-and-away basis, except for the one-match final. The mechanism of the draws for each round is as follows:
In the draw for the round of 32, the twelve group winners and the four third-placed teams from the Champions League group stage with the better group records are seeded, and the twelve group runners-up and the other four third-placed teams from the Champions League group stage are unseeded. The seeded teams are drawn against the unseeded teams, with the seeded teams hosting the second leg. Teams from the same group or the same association cannot be drawn against each other.
In the draws for the round of 16 onwards, there are no seedings, and teams from the same group or the same association can be drawn against each other.

Bracket

Round of 32
The draw for the round of 32 was held on 12 December 2016. The first legs were played on 16 February, and the second legs were played on 22 and 23 February 2017.

Round of 16
The draw for the round of 16 was held on 24 February 2017. The first legs were played on 9 March, and the second legs were played on 16 March 2017.

Quarter-finals
The draw for the quarter-finals was held on 17 March 2017. The first legs were played on 13 April, and the second legs were played on 20 April 2017.

Semi-finals
The draw for the semi-finals was held on 21 April 2017. The first legs were played on 3 and 4 May, and the second legs were played on 11 May 2017.

Final

The final was played on 24 May 2017 at Friends Arena in Solna, Sweden. The "home" team (for administrative purposes) was determined by an additional draw held after the semi-final draw.

Statistics
Statistics exclude qualifying rounds and play-off round.

Top goalscorers

Top assists

Squad of the season
The UEFA technical study group selected the following 18 players as the squad of the tournament.

Player of the season
A new UEFA Europa League Player of the Season award was introduced for the 2016–17 season. Votes were cast by coaches of the 48 teams in the group stage, together with 55 journalists selected by the European Sports Media (ESM) group, representing each of UEFA's member associations. The coaches were not allowed to vote for players from their own teams. Jury members selected their top three players, with the first receiving five points, the second three and the third one. The shortlist of the top three players were announced on 4 August 2017. The award winner was announced and presented to during the 2017–18 UEFA Europa League group stage draw in Monaco on 25 August 2017.

See also
2016–17 UEFA Champions League
2017 UEFA Super Cup

References

External links

2016–17 UEFA Europa League

 
2
2016-17